Rustia alba is a species of plant in the family Rubiaceae. It is endemic to Ecuador.

Sources 

alba
Endemic flora of Ecuador
Vulnerable plants
Taxonomy articles created by Polbot